The women's wakeboard freestyle competition in water skiing at the 2001 World Games took place from 23 to 25 August 2001 at the Ogata Water Ski Course in Ogata, Akita, Japan.

Competition format
A total of 7 athletes entered the competition. Best three athletes from preliminary round qualify to the final.

Results

Preliminary

Final

References

External links
 Results on IWGA website

Water skiing at the 2001 World Games